Humboldt's flying squirrel (Glaucomys oregonensis) is one of three species of the genus Glaucomys, the only flying squirrels found in North America. The squirrel was named after the naturalist Alexander von Humboldt and California's Humboldt County, which is one of the areas inhabited by the squirrel.

Taxonomy
Using genetic analyses, Arbogast et al. (2017) showed that Humboldt's flying squirrel, previously thought to be conspecific with the northern flying squirrel, was actually a distinct species. The San Bernardino flying squirrel subspecies (G. o. californicus) is considered a Critically Imperiled Subspecies by NatureServe.

Description
They do not actually fly but glide from tree to tree. They are similar in appearance to the northern flying squirrel, however, they are generally smaller and have darker pelage. They are good gliders but clumsy walkers on the ground.

Fluorescence 
Under ultraviolet light, females and males of all 3 species of Glaucomys fluoresce in varying intensities of pink on both dorsal and ventral surfaces. The fluorescence is hypothesized to help the flying squirrels find each other in low light and mimic the plumage of owls to evade predation.
This hypothesis has been challenged by Toussaint et al. (2022)  who instead suggest that the pink luminescence is a byproduct of the body's waste management. Moreover, these authors argue that it is far from evident that UV illuminating sources that occur naturally are sufficient to elicit luminescence distinguishable from ambient visible light. An ecological role for the pink luminescence is therefore not likely.

Diet and behaviour
They feed on a variety of plant material as well as tree sap, fungi, insects, carrion, bird eggs and nestlings. They mostly breed once a year in a cavity lined with lichen or other soft material. Unlike most members of their family, flying squirrels are strictly nocturnal. They nest in the tops of the trees away from the ground and predators.

Distribution and habitat 

Humboldt's flying squirrels are found in coniferous and mixed coniferous forests from southern British Columbia to southern California. They live in thick coastal forests where there is plenty of room for them to glide from tree to tree. Populations of Humboldt's flying squirrels are more concentrated in old forests where the relatively stable environment allows for fewer offspring in each litter.

References

Glaucomys
Squirrel, Humboldt's flying
Mammals of Canada
Mammals described in 1839
Taxa named by John Bachman